Constituent Assembly elections were held in Bolivia on 2 July 1944.

Results

Aftermath
On 4 August, 1944 the Constituent Assembly confirmed President Gualberto Villarroel López, who had assumed the presidency on 20 December 1943 as a result of a coup d'état.

See also
Bolivian Constituent Assembly, 1944–1946

References

Elections in Bolivia
Bolivia
Legislative election
Election and referendum articles with incomplete results